Parkinsonia aculeata is a species of perennial flowering tree in the pea family, Fabaceae. Common names include palo verde, Mexican palo verde, Parkinsonia, Jerusalem thorn, jelly bean tree, palo de rayo, and retama.

Etymology
The genus name Parkinsonia honors the English botanist John Parkinson (1567–1650), while the species Latin name aculeata refers to the thorny stem of this plant.

The name "Jerusalem thorn" stems from a mistranslation of the Spanish/Portuguese word girasol ('turning toward the sun').

Description
 Parkinsonia aculeata may be a spiny shrub or a small tree. Palo verde may have single or multiple stems and many branches with pendulous leaves. The leaves and stems are hairless. The leaves are alternate and pennate (15 to 20 cm long). The flattened petiole is edged by two rows of 25–30 tiny oval leaflets; the leaflets are soon deciduous in dry weather (and during the winter in some areas) leaving the green petioles and branches to photosynthesize.

The flowers are yellow- orange and fragrant,  in diameter, growing from a long slender stalk in groups of eight to ten. They have  five sepals and five petals, four of them clearer and rhomboid ovate, the fifth elongated, with a warmer yellow and purple spots at the base. The flowering period is in the middle months of spring (March–April or September–October). The flowers are pollinated by bees. The fruit is a seedpod, leathery in appearance, light brown when mature.

Invasive problems
P. aculeata is a major invasive species in Australia, as it is listed as a Weed of National Significance and is ranked as Australia's worst weed. It is also a major problem in parts of tropical Africa, Hawaii, and other Islands in the Pacific Ocean.

It was introduced to Australia as an ornamental tree and for shade around 1900.

It forms dense thickets, preventing access for humans, native animals and livestock to waterways. The fruits (seedpods) float, and the plant spreads by dropping pods into water, or pods are washed downstream by seasonal flooding.  Without the scarifying received by tumbling in streambeds, the seeds are slow to germinate.

Several control methods are used to reduce the existing population and the spread of P. aculeata in Australia. Three insects have been introduced to Australia for biological control; the parkinsonia bean weevils, Penthobruchus germaini and Mimosestes ulkei, both have larvae that specifically eat the seeds from parkinsonia pods and are proving to be a useful management tool, and the parkinsonia leaf bug, Rhinacloa callicrates, which destroys photosynthetic tissues but has had little overall impact on the plant. Fire is effective for young trees; mechanical removal and herbicides are also used.

Distribution
P. aculeata is native to the southwestern United States and northern Mexico south to Galapagos Islands and northern Argentina. It has been introduced in Africa, Australia, India, Pakistan and Spain.

Habitat
Parkinsonia aculeata has a high tolerance to drought, simply attaining shorter stature. In moist and humus-rich environments it becomes a taller, spreading shade tree.

Uses
In Mexico, the leaves are steeped and made into medicine for fever and epilepsy.

The foliage is seldom browsed by livestock due to the spines.

Gallery

References

Cooperative Centre for Weed Management. Weed of the month - Parkinsonia aculeata, April 2005
QLD Dept of Natural Resources and Mines, Land Protection. 2004. NRM facts pest series: Parkinsonia 
Pacific Island Ecosystems at Risk: Parkinsonia aculeata
 Pignatti S. - Flora d'Italia – Edagricole – 1982. Vol. I, pag. 625

External links
 

 
 Biolib: Parkinsonia aculeata
 Schede di Botanica: Parkinsonia aculeata

aculeata
Plants described in 1753
Taxa named by Carl Linnaeus
North American desert flora
Trees of Argentina
Trees of the Southwestern United States
Trees of the South-Central United States
Trees of Baja California
Trees of Baja California Sur
Trees of Bolivia
Trees of Ecuador
Trees of Paraguay
Trees of Peru
Trees of Uruguay
Flora of the Rio Grande valleys
Trees of Sonora
Trees of Sinaloa
Trees of Chihuahua (state)
Trees of Coahuila
Trees of Nuevo León
Trees of Tamaulipas
Flora of the Sonoran Deserts
Flora of the Chihuahuan Desert
Flora of the Mexican Plateau
Flora without expected TNC conservation status